The women's 25 metre pistol was a shooting sports event held as part of the Shooting at the 1984 Summer Olympics programme. It was the first time the event was held for women at the Olympics. The competition was held on July 29, 1984 at the shooting ranges in Los Angeles. 30 shooters from 21 nations competed.

Results

References

Shooting at the 1984 Summer Olympics
Olymp
Shoo